Orallo is a locality within the municipality of Villablino in the Spanish province of León. Orallo's major landmark is the Church of Santa Marina, which dates back to medieval times. The Orallo River runs beside the town just to the west.

References 

Populated places in the Province of León